Statistics of Dhivehi League in the 1991 season.

Overview
New Radiant SC won the championship.

References
RSSSF

Dhivehi League seasons
Maldives
Maldives
football